Tolstovka is a rural locality (a selo) in Tolstovsky Selsoviet of Tambovsky District, Amur Oblast, Russia. The population was 762 as of 2018. There are 8 streets.

Geography 
Tolstovka is located on the Bolshoy Alim River, 18 km north of Tambovka (the district's administrative centre) by road. Sadovoye is the nearest rural locality.

References 

Rural localities in Tambovsky District, Amur Oblast